The dwarf multimammate mouse (Serengetimys pernanus) is a species of rodent in the family Muridae. It is the only member of the genus Serengetimys; it was formerly classified in the genus Mastomys. 

It is found in Kenya, Rwanda, and Tanzania.
Its natural habitat is savanna, such as that present in the famous Serengeti National Park, which gave the genus its name.

References

Old World rats and mice
Rodents of Africa
Mammals described in 1921
Taxonomy articles created by Polbot
Taxobox binomials not recognized by IUCN